is a 1971 Japanese yakuza film directed by Takashi Nomura.

Cast
 Hideki Takahashi as Kikukawa Masayoshi
 Masako Izumi as Sawada Kaoru
 Mikio Narita as Mine Eikichi
 Tatsuya Fuji as Nakai Seiji
 Eiji Gō as Sada
 Miyoko Akaza as Oshin
 Hei Enoki as Otsuka
 Shigeru Tsuyuguchi as Ushio Keizō
 Yoshi Katō as Ushio Kōnosuke
 Toru Abe as Tokuzawa Hideo

References

External links
 

Nikkatsu films
Yakuza films
Japanese crime films
1970s Japanese-language films
1970s Japanese films